In mathematics, a binary relation associates elements of one set, called the domain, with elements of another set, called the codomain. It is a generalization of the more widely understood idea of a unary function. It encodes the common concept of relation: an element  is related to an element , if and only if the pair  belongs to the set of ordered pairs that defines the binary relation. A binary relation is the most studied special case  of an -ary relation over sets , which is a subset of the Cartesian product 

In this relation, for instance, the prime number 2 is related to numbers such as −4, 0, 6, 10, but not to 1 or 9, just as the prime number 3 is related to 0, 6, and 9, but not to 4 or 13.

Binary relations are used in many branches of mathematics to model a wide variety of concepts. These include, among others:
 the "is greater than", "is equal to", and "divides" relations in arithmetic;
 the "is congruent to" relation in geometry;
 the "is adjacent to" relation in graph theory;
 the "is orthogonal to" relation in linear algebra.

A function may be defined as a special kind of binary relation. Binary relations are also heavily used in computer science.

Since relations are sets, they can be manipulated using set operations, including union, intersection, and complementation, and satisfying the laws of an algebra of sets. Beyond that, operations like the converse of a relation and the composition of relations are available, satisfying the laws of a calculus of relations, for which there are textbooks by Ernst Schröder, Clarence Lewis, and Gunther Schmidt. A deeper analysis of relations involves decomposing them into subsets called , and placing them in a complete lattice.

In some systems of axiomatic set theory, relations are extended to classes, which are generalizations of sets. This extension is needed for, among other things, modeling the concepts of "is an element of" or "is a subset of" in set theory, without running into logical inconsistencies such as Russell's paradox.

Definition 

The statement  reads "x is R-related to y" and is denoted by xRy. The  of R is the union of its domain of definition and its codomain of definition.

To emphasize the fact that X and Y are allowed to be different, a binary relation is also called a heterogeneous relation.

In a binary relation, the order of the elements is important; if  then yRx can be true or false independently of xRy. For example, 3 divides 9, but 9 does not divide 3.

Operations

Union 

The identity element is the empty relation.

Intersection 

The identity element is the universal relation. For example, the relation "is divisible by 6" is the intersection of the relations "is divisible by 3" and "is divisible by 2".

Composition 

The identity element is the identity relation. The order of R and S in the notation  used here agrees with the standard notational order for composition of functions. For example, the composition (is parent of)(is mother of) yields (is maternal grandparent of), while the composition (is mother of)(is parent of) yields (is grandmother of). For the former case, if x is the parent of y and y is the mother of z, then x is the maternal grandparent of z.

Converse 

Complement 

The complement of the converse relation  is the converse of the complement: 

If  the complement has the following properties:
 If a relation is symmetric, then so is the complement.
 The complement of a reflexive relation is irreflexive—and vice versa.
 The complement of a strict weak order is a total preorder—and vice versa.

Restriction 

If a relation is reflexive, irreflexive, symmetric, antisymmetric, asymmetric, transitive, total, trichotomous, a partial order, total order, strict weak order, total preorder (weak order), or an equivalence relation, then so too are its restrictions.

However, the transitive closure of a restriction is a subset of the restriction of the transitive closure, i.e., in general not equal. For example, restricting the relation "x is parent of y" to females yields the relation "x is mother of the woman y"; its transitive closure doesn't relate a woman with her paternal grandmother. On the other hand, the transitive closure of "is parent of" is "is ancestor of"; its restriction to females does relate a woman with her paternal grandmother.

Also, the various concepts of completeness (not to be confused with being "total") do not carry over to restrictions. For example, over the real numbers a property of the relation  is that every non-empty subset  with an upper bound in  has a least upper bound (also called supremum) in  However, for the rational numbers this supremum is not necessarily rational, so the same property does not hold on the restriction of the relation  to the rational numbers.

A binary relation R over sets X and Y is said to be  a relation S over X and Y, written  if R is a subset of S, that is, for all  and  if xRy, then xSy.

Matrix representation 
Binary relations over sets X and Y can be represented algebraically by logical matrices indexed by X and Y with entries in the Boolean semiring (addition corresponds to OR and multiplication to AND) where matrix addition corresponds to union of relations, matrix multiplication corresponds to composition of relations (of a relation over X and Y and a relation over Y and Z), the Hadamard product corresponds to intersection of relations, the zero matrix corresponds to the empty relation, and the matrix of ones corresponds to the universal relation. Homogeneous relations (when ) form a matrix semiring (indeed, a matrix semialgebra over the Boolean semiring) where the identity matrix corresponds to the identity relation.

Examples

1) The following example shows that the choice of codomain is important. Suppose there are four objects  and four people  A possible relation on A and B is the relation "is owned by", given by  That is, John owns the ball, Mary owns the doll, and Venus owns the car. Nobody owns the cup and Ian owns nothing; see the 1st example. As a set, R does not involve Ian, and therefore R could have been viewed as a subset of  i.e. a relation over A and  see the 2nd example. While the 2nd example relation is surjective (see below), the 1st is not.

2) Let A = {Indian, Arctic, Atlantic, Pacific}, the oceans of the globe, and B = { NA, SA, AF, EU, AS, AU, AA }, the continents. Let aRb represent that ocean a borders continent b. Then the logical matrix for this relation is:

The connectivity of the planet Earth can be viewed through R RT and RT R, the former being a  relation on A, which is the universal relation ( or a logical matrix of all ones). This universal relation reflects the fact that every ocean is separated from the others by at most one continent.

3) Visualization of relations leans on graph theory: For relations on a set (homogeneous relations), a directed graph illustrates a relation and a graph a symmetric relation. For heterogeneous relations a hypergraph has edges possibly with more than two nodes, and can be illustrated by a bipartite graph.

Just as the clique is integral to relations on a set, so bicliques are used to describe heterogeneous relations; indeed, they are the "concepts" that generate a lattice associated with a relation.

4) Hyperbolic orthogonality: Time and space are different categories, and temporal properties are separate from spatial properties. He used an indefinite inner product, and specified that a time vector is normal to a space vector when that product is zero. The indefinite inner product in a composition algebra is given by
 where the overbar denotes conjugation.
As a relation between some temporal events and some spatial events, hyperbolic orthogonality (as found in split-complex numbers) is a heterogeneous relation.

5) A geometric configuration can be considered a relation between its points and its lines. The relation is expressed as incidence. Finite and infinite projective and affine planes are included. Jakob Steiner pioneered the cataloguing of configurations with the Steiner systems  which have an n-element set S and a set of k-element subsets called blocks, such that a subset with t elements lies in just one block. These incidence structures have been generalized with block designs. The incidence matrix used in these geometrical contexts corresponds to the logical matrix used generally with binary relations.
An incidence structure is a triple D = (V, B, I) where V and B are any two disjoint sets and I is a binary relation between V and B, i.e.

Special types of binary relations 

Some important types of binary relations R over sets X and Y are listed below.

Uniqueness properties:
 Injective (also called left-unique): for all  and all  if  and  then . For such a relation, {Y} is called a primary key of R. For example, the green and blue binary relations in the diagram are injective, but the red one is not (as it relates both −1 and 1 to 1), nor the black one (as it relates both −1 and 1 to 0).
 Functional (also called right-unique, right-definite or univalent): for all  and all  if  and  then . For such a relation,  is called  of R. For example, the red and green binary relations in the diagram are functional, but the blue one is not (as it relates 1 to both −1 and 1), nor the black one (as it relates 0 to both −1 and 1).
 One-to-one: injective and functional. For example, the green binary relation in the diagram is one-to-one, but the red, blue and black ones are not.
 One-to-many: injective and not functional. For example, the blue binary relation in the diagram is one-to-many, but the red, green and black ones are not.
 Many-to-one: functional and not injective. For example, the red binary relation in the diagram is many-to-one, but the green, blue and black ones are not.
 Many-to-many: not injective nor functional. For example, the black binary relation in the diagram is many-to-many, but the red, green and blue ones are not.

Totality properties (only definable if the domain X and codomain Y are specified):
 Total (also called left-total): for all x in X there exists a y in Y such that . For example, the red and green binary relations in the diagram are total, but the blue one is not (as it does not relate −1 to any real number), nor the black one (as it does not relate 2 to any real number). As another example, > is a total relation over the integers. But it is not a total relation over the positive integers, because there is no  in the positive integers such that . However, < is a total relation over the positive integers, the rational numbers and the real numbers. Every reflexive relation is total: for a given , choose . 
 Surjective (also called right-total or onto): for all y in Y, there exists an x in X such that xRy. In other words, the codomain of definition of R is equal to Y. For example, the green and blue binary relations in the diagram are surjective, but the red one is not (as it does not relate any real number to −1), nor the black one (as it does not relate any real number to 2).

Uniqueness and totality properties (only definable if the domain X and codomain Y are specified):
 A : a binary relation that is functional and total. For example, the red and green binary relations in the diagram are functions, but the blue and black ones are not.
 An : a function that is injective. For example, the green binary relation in the diagram is an injection, but the red, blue and black ones are not.
 A : a function that is surjective. For example, the green binary relation in the diagram is a surjection, but the red, blue and black ones are not.
 A : a function that is injective and surjective. For example, the green binary relation in the diagram is a bijection, but the red, blue and black ones are not.

If relations over proper classes are allowed:
, is a set. For example, the relation  is set-like, and every relation on two sets is set-like. The usual ordering < over the class of ordinal numbers is a set-like relation, while its inverse > is not.

Sets versus classes 
Certain mathematical "relations", such as "equal to", "subset of", and "member of", cannot be understood to be binary relations as defined above, because their domains and codomains cannot be taken to be sets in the usual systems of axiomatic set theory. For example, to model the general concept of "equality" as a binary relation  take the domain and codomain to be the "class of all sets", which is not a set in the usual set theory.

In most mathematical contexts, references to the relations of equality, membership and subset are harmless because they can be understood implicitly to be restricted to some set in the context. The usual work-around to this problem is to select a "large enough" set A, that contains all the objects of interest, and work with the restriction =A instead of =. Similarly, the "subset of" relation  needs to be restricted to have domain and codomain P(A) (the power set of a specific set A): the resulting set relation can be denoted by  Also, the "member of" relation needs to be restricted to have domain A and codomain P(A) to obtain a binary relation  that is a set. Bertrand Russell has shown that assuming  to be defined over all sets leads to a contradiction in naive set theory, see Russell's paradox.

Another solution to this problem is to use a set theory with proper classes, such as NBG or Morse–Kelley set theory, and allow the domain and codomain (and so the graph) to be proper classes: in such a theory, equality, membership, and subset are binary relations without special comment. (A minor modification needs to be made to the concept of the ordered triple , as normally a proper class cannot be a member of an ordered tuple; or of course one can identify the binary relation with its graph in this context.) With this definition one can for instance define a binary relation over every set and its power set.

Homogeneous relation 

A homogeneous relation over a set X is a binary relation over X and itself, i.e. it is a subset of the Cartesian product  It is also simply called a (binary) relation over X.

A homogeneous relation R over a set X may be identified with a directed simple graph permitting loops, where X is the vertex set and R is the edge set (there is an edge from a vertex x to a vertex y if and only if ).
The set of all homogeneous relations  over a set X is the power set  which is a Boolean algebra augmented with the involution of mapping of a relation to its converse relation.

Some important properties that a homogeneous relation  over a set  may have are:
 : for all  . For example,  is a reflexive relation but > is not.
 : for all  not . For example,  is an irreflexive relation, but  is not.
 : for all  if  then . For example, "is a blood relative of" is a symmetric relation.
 : for all  if  and  then  For example,  is an antisymmetric relation.
 : for all  if  then not . A relation is asymmetric if and only if it is both antisymmetric and irreflexive. For example, > is an asymmetric relation, but  is not.
 : for all  if  and  then . A transitive relation is irreflexive if and only if it is asymmetric. For example, "is ancestor of" is a transitive relation, while "is parent of" is not.

A  is a relation that is reflexive, antisymmetric, and transitive. A  is a relation that is irreflexive, antisymmetric, and transitive. A  is a relation that is reflexive, antisymmetric, transitive and connected. A  is a relation that is irreflexive, antisymmetric, transitive and connected.
An  is a relation that is reflexive, symmetric, and transitive.

All operations defined in section  also apply to homogeneous relations.
Beyond that, a homogeneous relation over a set X may be subjected to closure operations like:
  the smallest reflexive relation over X containing R,
  the smallest transitive relation over X containing R,
  the smallest equivalence relation over X containing R.

Heterogeneous relation
In mathematics, a heterogeneous relation is a binary relation, a subset of a Cartesian product  where A and B are possibly distinct sets. The prefix hetero is from the Greek ἕτερος (heteros, "other, another, different").

Calculus of relations
Developments in algebraic logic have facilitated usage of binary relations. The calculus of relations includes the algebra of sets, extended by composition of relations and the use of converse relations. The inclusion  meaning that aRb implies aSb, sets the scene in a lattice of relations. But since  the inclusion symbol is superfluous. Nevertheless, composition of relations and manipulation of the operators according to Schröder rules, provides a calculus to work in the power set of 

In contrast to homogeneous relations, the composition of relations operation is only a partial function. The necessity of matching range to domain of composed relations has led to the suggestion that the study of heterogeneous relations is a chapter of category theory as in the category of sets, except that the morphisms of this category are relations. The  of the category Rel are sets, and the relation-morphisms compose as required in a category.

Induced concept lattice
Binary relations have been described through their induced concept lattices:
A concept C ⊂ R satisfies two properties: (1) The logical matrix of C is the outer product of logical vectors
 logical vectors. (2) C is maximal, not contained in any other outer product. Thus C is described as a non-enlargeable rectangle.

For a given relation  the set of concepts, enlarged by their joins and meets, forms an "induced lattice of concepts", with inclusion  forming a preorder.

The MacNeille completion theorem (1937) (that any partial order may be embedded in a complete lattice) is cited in a 2013 survey article "Decomposition of relations on concept lattices". The decomposition is
 where f and g are functions, called  or left-total, univalent relations in this context. The "induced concept lattice is isomorphic to the cut completion of the partial order E that belongs to the minimal decomposition (f, g, E) of the relation R."

Particular cases are considered below: E total order corresponds to Ferrers type, and E identity corresponds to difunctional, a generalization of equivalence relation on a set.

Relations may be ranked by the Schein rank which counts the number of concepts necessary to cover a relation. Structural analysis of relations with concepts provides an approach for data mining.

Particular relations

 Proposition: If R is a serial relation and RT is its transpose, then  where  is the m × m identity relation.
 Proposition: If R is a surjective relation, then  where  is the  identity relation.

Difunctional 

The idea of a difunctional relation is to partition objects by distinguishing attributes, as a generalization of the concept of an equivalence relation. One way this can be done is with an intervening set  of indicators. The partitioning relation  is a composition of relations using  relations  Jacques Riguet named these relations difunctional since the composition F GT involves univalent relations, commonly called partial functions.

In 1950 Rigeut showed that such relations satisfy the inclusion:

In automata theory, the term rectangular relation has also been used to denote a difunctional relation. This terminology recalls the fact that, when represented as a logical matrix, the columns and rows of a difunctional relation can be arranged as a block matrix with rectangular blocks of ones on the (asymmetric) main diagonal.

Using the notation {y: xRy} = xR, a difunctional relation can also be characterized as a relation R such that wherever x1R and x2R have a non-empty intersection, then these two sets coincide; formally  implies 

In 1997 researchers found "utility of binary decomposition based on difunctional dependencies in database management." Furthermore, difunctional relations are fundamental in the study of bisimulations.

In the context of homogeneous relations, a partial equivalence relation is difunctional.

Ferrers type
A strict order on a set is a homogeneous relation arising in order theory.
In 1951 Jacques Riguet adopted the ordering of a partition of an integer, called a Ferrers diagram, to extend ordering to binary relations in general.

The corresponding logical matrix of a general binary relation has rows which finish with a sequence of ones. Thus the dots of a Ferrer's diagram are changed to ones and aligned on the right in the matrix.

An algebraic statement required for a Ferrers type relation R is

If any one of the relations  is of Ferrers type, then all of them are.

Contact
Suppose B is the power set of A, the set of all subsets of A. Then a relation g is a contact relation if it satisfies three properties: 
 
 
 
The set membership relation, ε = "is an element of", satisfies these properties so ε is a contact relation. The notion of a general contact relation was introduced by Georg Aumann in 1970.

In terms of the calculus of relations, sufficient conditions for a contact relation include
 
where  is the converse of set membership (∈).

Preorder R\R
Every relation R generates a preorder  which is the left residual. Then 
 so that  is a reflexive relation.

To show transitivity, one requires that  Recall that  is the largest relation such that  Then 

 (repeat)
 (Schröder's rule)
 (complementation)
 (definition)

The inclusion relation Ω on the power set of U can be obtained in this way from the membership relation  on subsets of U:

Fringe of a relation
Given a relation R, a sub-relation called its  is defined as

When R is a partial identity relation, difunctional, or a block diagonal relation, then fringe(R) = R. Otherwise the fringe operator selects a boundary sub-relation described in terms of its logical matrix: fringe(R) is the side diagonal if R is an upper right triangular linear order or strict order. Fringe(R) is the block fringe if R is irreflexive or upper right block triangular. Fringe(R) is a sequence of boundary rectangles when R is of Ferrers type.

On the other hand, Fringe(R) = ∅ when R is a dense, linear, strict order.

Mathematical heaps

Given two sets A and B, the set of binary relations between them  can be equipped with a ternary operation  where bT denotes the converse relation of b. In 1953 Viktor Wagner used properties of this ternary operation to define semiheaps, heaps, and generalized heaps. The contrast of heterogeneous and homogeneous relations is highlighted by these definitions:

See also 

 Abstract rewriting system
 Additive relation, a many-valued homomorphism between modules
 Allegory (category theory)
 Category of relations, a category having sets as objects and binary relations as morphisms 
 Confluence (term rewriting), discusses several unusual but fundamental properties of binary relations
 Correspondence (algebraic geometry), a binary relation defined by algebraic equations
 Hasse diagram, a graphic means to display an order relation
 Incidence structure, a heterogeneous relation between set of points and lines
 Logic of relatives, a theory of relations by Charles Sanders Peirce
 Order theory, investigates properties of order relations

Notes

References

Bibliography 
 
 Ernst Schröder (1895) Algebra der Logik, Band III, via Internet Archive

External links